Site No. RH00-062 is a survey monument located at the tripoint of Richardson County, Nebraska, and Brown and Doniphan counties in Kansas. The monument marks the starting point of the land survey of the Kansas-Nebraska border along the 40th parallel north, which intersects the top of the Missouri River's western bluff at this spot. U.S. Deputy Surveyor Charles A. Manners erected the monument in 1855 at the beginning of the survey. In 1924, the monument was displaced and reset at the wrong location before Leo M. Petersen reset it in a sturdier base.

The monument was added to the National Register of Historic Places on June 19, 1987.

See also
 OKKAMO Tri-State Marker: monument on the Arkansas-Missouri-Oklahoma tripoint
 Site No. JF00-072, the intersection of the 40th parallel north and the sixth principal meridian

References

External links

Monuments and memorials on the National Register of Historic Places in Nebraska
Buildings and structures completed in 1855
Buildings and structures in Richardson County, Nebraska
Buildings and structures in Brown County, Kansas
Buildings and structures in Doniphan County, Kansas
Monuments and memorials on the National Register of Historic Places in Kansas
National Register of Historic Places in Brown County, Kansas
National Register of Historic Places in Doniphan County, Kansas
Historic surveying landmarks in the United States
Boundary markers
1855 establishments in Kansas Territory
1855 establishments in Nebraska Territory
Borders of Kansas
Borders of Nebraska